In the theory of probability for stochastic processes, the reflection principle for a Wiener process states that if the path of a Wiener process f(t)  reaches a value f(s) = a at time t = s,  then the subsequent path after time s has the same distribution as the reflection of the subsequent path about the value a. More formally, the reflection principle refers to a lemma concerning the distribution of the supremum of the Wiener process, or Brownian motion. The result relates the distribution of the supremum of Brownian motion up to time t to the distribution of the process at time t. It is a corollary of the strong Markov property of Brownian motion.

Statement

Assuming  , due to continuity of Wiener process, each path (one sampled realization) of Wiener process on (0,t) which ends up at or above value/level/threshold/crossing point 'a' the time t  must have crossed a threshold 'a' at some earlier time  for the first time . (It can cross level 'a' multiple times on the interval (0,t), we take the earliest.) 
For every such path you can define another sampled path of Wiener process W' on (0,t) that is reflected or vertically flipped on the sub-interval  symmetrically around level 'a' from the original path.(  )  That reflected path also reached value  on the interval (0,t) and is also a Wiener process or Brownian motion. Both original and reflected paths form set of paths that reach value 'a' on (0,t) and they are twice as many as those that end up at or above threshold 'a' (original path only) at time t. If each path is equally probable (imagine symmetric random walk from 0 on trees) then reaching threshold 'a' at any time on (0,t) is twice as likely as ending up at or above threshold 'a' at the time t. What about paths that reach level 'a' on (0,t) and then end up somewhere at value  at the time t? Are they accounted for? Yes. There are exactly those reflected paths that are counted towards the number of the paths that reached threshold 'a' only and they are exactly as many as those that ended up above threshold 'a' at the time t. Once Wiener process reached threshold 'a' , then due to the symmetry there is an equal probability (p=0.5) it will end up above or below threshold 'a' at any future time t. So conditional probability:
.
Paths with  that never reach threshold 'a' are never considered.
 

and the indicator function  and is defined similarly.  The stronger form implies the original lemma by choosing .

Proof
The earliest stopping time for reaching crossing point a, is an almost surely bounded stopping time. Then the probability distribution for the last time  is at or above the threshold  in the time interval  can be decomposed as
.
By the tower property for conditional expectations, the second term reduces to:

The proof of the lemma is completed by substituting this into the second line of the first equation.

.

Consequences
The reflection principle is often used to simplify distributional properties of Brownian motion. Considering Brownian motion on the restricted interval  then the reflection principle allows us to prove that the location of the maxima , satisfying , has the arcsine distribution. This is one of the Lévy arcsine laws.

References

Stochastic calculus
Probability theorems